Otis E. Young (July 4, 1932 – October 12, 2001) was an actor and writer. He co-starred in a television Western, The Outcasts (1968–1969), with Don Murray.  Young was the second African-American actor to co-star in a television Western, the first being Raymond St Jacques on the final season of Rawhide in 1965. Young played another memorable role as Jack Nicholson's shore patrol partner Richard "Mule" Mulhall in the 1973 comedy-drama film The Last Detail, and his later film credits included the low budget horror films The Capture of Bigfoot (1979) and Blood Beach (1981).

Early life and education
Young was born in Providence, Rhode Island, one of 14 children. He joined the U.S. Marine Corps at the age of 17 and served in the Korean War. He then enrolled in acting classes at New York University School of Education where his classmate was the young Louis Gossett Jr.

Career
He trained at the Neighborhood Playhouse, and worked off-Broadway as an actor and writer in the early 1960s. He appeared on Broadway in James Baldwin's Blues for Mister Charlie, with such notables as Diana Sands, and Al Freeman, Jr. His first movie appearance was in Murder in Mississippi (1965).

On television, Young portrayed Jemal David, a former slave, in the ABC western The Outcasts (1968-1969). and the Episode "Identity Crisis" in Columbo (season 5).

He went to study theology at L. I. F. E. Bible College in Los Angeles and obtained a Bachelor of Arts in 1983.  After, he was ordained pastor, eventually serving as senior pastor of Elim Foursquare Gospel Church in Rochester, New York, from 1986 to 1988. 

He taught acting classes at School Without Walls, a college-like alternative public high school in Rochester, from 1987 through 1991. In 1989 he joined the faculty at Monroe Community College in Rochester; he remained there as a Professor of Communication and head of the Drama Department until his retirement in 1999.

Death
Young suffered a stroke in Los Angeles and died on October 12, 2001, at the Veterans Hospital. He was buried by his (second) wife, Barbara, in Rochester NY, soon after a memorial ceremony was held at Pepperdine University Chapel, by his children: Saudia Young, Lovelady Young, El Mahdi Young, and Jemal Young. His memorial service was held at Pepperdine University's chapel.

References

External links
 
at the African American Registry

1932 births
2001 deaths
African-American male actors
Monroe Community College faculty
American clergy
Neighborhood Playhouse School of the Theatre alumni
Actors from Providence, Rhode Island
Male actors from Rochester, New York
American male television actors
Male Western (genre) film actors
American male film actors
Male actors from Rhode Island
Writers from Rochester, New York
20th-century American male actors
20th-century American clergy
20th-century African-American people